Lists of animated feature films released in the 1970s organized by year of release:

List of animated feature films of 1970
List of animated feature films of 1971
List of animated feature films of 1972
List of animated feature films of 1973
List of animated feature films of 1974
List of animated feature films of 1975
List of animated feature films of 1976
List of animated feature films of 1977
List of animated feature films of 1978
List of animated feature films of 1979

1970s
Animated